Azadinium spinosum is a species of dinoflagellates that produces azaspiracid toxins (toxins associated with shellfish poisoning), particularly AZA 1, AZA 2 and an isomer of AZA 2.

Description

It measures 12–16 µm in length and 7–11 µm wide, is a peridinin-containing photosynthetic dinoflagellate with a thin theca. Its large nucleus is spherical and present posteriorly, whereas its single chloroplast is parietal, lobed, and extends into the epi- and hyposome.

References

Further reading

External links

Dinophyceae